Magnesium orotate, the magnesium salt of orotic acid,  is a mineral supplement.  It can be used in treating extracellular magnesium deficiency, as well as in mitigating magnesium depletion that inhibits the binding of adenosine triphosphate via orotic acid, which provides binding sites.

References 

Magnesium compounds